Until independence in 1975, São Tomé and Príncipe had few ties abroad except those that passed through Portugal. Following independence, the new government sought to expand its diplomatic relationships. A common language, tradition, and colonial legacy have led to close collaboration between São Tomé and other ex-Portuguese colonies in Africa, particularly Angola. São Toméan relations with other African countries in the region, such as Gabon and the Republic of the Congo, are also good. In December 2000, São Tomé signed the African Union treaty; it was later ratified by the National Assembly.

The São Toméan government has generally maintained a foreign policy based on nonalignment and cooperation with any country willing to assist in its economic development. In recent years, it has also increasingly emphasized ties to the United States and western Europe.

Bilateral relations

See also
List of diplomatic missions in São Tomé and Príncipe
List of diplomatic missions of São Tomé and Príncipe

References